T. A. Ahmed Kabir was a member of 16th Kerala Legislative Assembly. He was a member of Indian Union Muslim League and represents Mankada constituency. He was previously elected to Kerala Legislative Assembly in 2011 representing Mankada constituency.

Positions held
 General Secretary, District Committee, M.S.F. (1972)
 Member, Muslim Youth League First State Council (1973)
 Treasurer (1975), Secretary (1982) and General Secretary (1983) of Muslim Youth League State Committee
 President, Muslim Youth League District Committee, Ernakulam (1975)
 President and General Secretary of Muslim League Ernakulam District Committee
 President, KSTEO, STU District Committee, Ernakulam
 Chairman, Quaide Mullath Foundation, SIDCO, UEL, Kollam, KEL
 Vice President, KMEA
 Resident Editor, Chandrika daily (Kochi Edition)
 Editor, Sargadhara Magazine
 Secretary, State Muslim League Committee
 Member, Ernakulam District Council
 Syndicate Member, Mahatma Gandhi University; CUSAT
 Executive Member, Samastha Kerala Sahithya Parishath and Kerala History Association
 Secretary, State Muslim League Committee (present)
Executive Member, Indian Union Muslim League All Indian Committee (present)

Personal life
He is the son of pa Abdul Kahader and Haleema.  He was born at Alappuzha on 3 November 1955. He has a master's degree in arts.

References

1955 births
Living people
Members of the Kerala Legislative Assembly
Indian Union Muslim League politicians